David Ray is an American politician serving as a member of the Arkansas House of Representatives from the 40th district. Elected in November 2020, he assumed office on January 11, 2021.

Early life and education 
Ray is a native of Maumelle, Arkansas. He earned a Bachelor of Science degree in communications and political science from the University of the Ozarks.

Career 
During the 2014 United States Senate election in Arkansas, Ray worked as communications director for the Tom Cotton campaign. He later worked as director of the Arkansas chapter of Americans for Prosperity. From 2017 to 2020, he has been the chief of staff for Lieutenant Governor Tim Griffin. Ray was elected to the Arkansas House of Representatives in November 2020 and assumed office on January 11, 2021.

References 

Living people
Republican Party members of the Arkansas House of Representatives
People from Maumelle, Arkansas
People from Pulaski County, Arkansas
University of the Ozarks alumni
Year of birth missing (living people)